Melike Tarhan (born 3 March 1978 in Ghent) is a Belgian-Turkish musical artist.

Education
Tarhan was a scholarship student at Humboldt University in Berlin and graduated from Ghent University's English and German language department in 2002.

Career
While in Berlin, she took singing lessons from Claudia Herr, and took lessons in Indian singing techniques with Mahabub Khan'dan. In 2004 at Ghent University, she studied under the Italian singing teacher Mireille Capelle, and in 2005-2006 she participated in courses with Guidon Sax in the Conservatory of Ghent.

Albums
April 2004, her first album, called Macar, was released in Paris on the Long Distance / Harmonia label.

The album is named after Macar, a boy from the village of Emirdağ. He goes away to fight in the Gallipoli Campaign, part of World War I. His mother sees him in a dream, returning home on a white horse and handing his sword on the wall. The boy never returns.

Çanakkale nerde Suvermez nerde
Her ana dayanmaz bu zalım derde
Ahmed'in babasız eğlenmez evde
Yoksa yavrum seni vurdular m'ola
Kefensiz gabire goydular m'ola

Hücum etmiş Alamanın zabiti
Yavrumun kefeni asker kabutu
Salına girmeye yoktur tabutu
Yoksa yavrum seni vurdular m'ola
Kefensiz gabire goydular m'ola

References

External links
Official personal site

1978 births
Living people
Belgian people of Turkish descent
Musicians from Ghent
Humboldt University of Berlin alumni
Ghent University alumni
21st-century Turkish singers
21st-century Turkish women singers